Schimpff's Confectionery is a historic candy maker, confectionery store, and museum located in Jeffersonville, Indiana, within the Old Jeffersonville Historic District.

History 
The Schimpff family had been making candy in the Louisville, Kentucky area since the 1850s.

The current premises were opened on April 11, 1891 by Gustav Schimpff Sr. and Jr. and the family lived above the store. 

In 1937 the first and second levels of the business were flooded.

The company is currently owned by fourth generation family members Jill and Warren Schimpff, who took over the business in 1990.

Since 2000 the store has had two expansions to make room for a candy museum and a demonstration area for visitors to watch the candy being made.

Recognition 
It was featured on the History Channel's Modern Marvels in 2006 and by the Historic Landmarks Foundation of Indiana in 2004. It is also noted as one of Indiana's seven "Hidden Treasures".

See also
 List of attractions and events in the Louisville metropolitan area

References

External links

 
 Schimpff's Candy Museum

Confectionery companies of the United States
Jeffersonville, Indiana
Food museums in the United States
Museums in Clark County, Indiana
History museums in Indiana
Retail companies established in 1891
1891 establishments in Indiana